Žemaitkiemis meteorite is an ordinary chondrite that fell near Žemaitkiemis, Lithuania at about 8:33 pm on 2 February 1933. Using the argon–argon dating method, scientists have calculated its age to be about 520 million years. 

The fall was observed by the Koenigsberg Observatory. Since the meteorite fell near inhabited areas during winter, it was rather easy to locate the fragments in the snow. The largest pieces weighted . Two other fragments were gifted later –  and  – to the Institute of Geology and Geography in Vilnius.

The main mass, two largest fragments and 13 other fragments, are held by the Geology Museum of Vilnius University. Other fragments are held by:  by the National Museum in Prague,  by the Russian Academy of Science,  by the Natural History Museum in London,  by the National Museum of Natural History in Paris,  by the Field Museum of Natural History in Chicago,  by the Geological Survey of Canada, and others.

On 14 July 2017, President Dalia Grybauskaitė approved a coat of arms of Žemaitkiemis that features the meteorite fall.

References

External links
 Photo of 5.4 kg fragment
 Zemaitkiemis at wiki.Meteoritica.pl (in Polish)
 Zemaitkiemis at the Meteoritical Bulletin Database

February 1933 events
1933 in Lithuania
1933 in science
Meteorites found in Lithuania